Care farming is the use of farming practices for the stated purpose of providing or promoting healing, mental health, social, or educational care services. Convicts may also be required to spend time at care farms. Care farms may provide supervised, structured programs of farming-related activities, including animal husbandry, crop and vegetable production and woodland management.

Effectiveness

Working on a care farm can help adult offenders gain new skills. More studies should be done on care farming to determine if it can be an alternative and adjuvant therapy for people with some mental illnesses (such as anxiety or depression).

Care farming can be beneficial for the animals on the farm. For example, greater exposure to humans might reduce some of the stresses caused by typical agricultural practices, and having more people see the animals might increase the detection of parasites or other animal health issues.

History

Benjamin Rush (1746–1813) published 5 books in a series of Medical Inquiries and Observations, the last being concerned with The Diseases of The Mind (1812). In this volume, the practice of horticulture is mentioned twice.

See also
 Animal-assisted therapy
 Ecopsychology
 Green exercise
 Horticultural therapy
 Prison farm

References

External links

National care farming organisations and networks 
 Agriculture & Care Federation (Netherlands)
 Care Farming Scotland (United Kingdom)
 Care Farming UK (United Kingdom)
 Green Care Plattform (Austria)
 Green Care – Plattform für Akteure und Nutzende im Bereich Umwelt und Gesundheit (Schweiz)
 Support office for Green Care (Flanders, Belgium)

Agriculture
Therapeutic community
Biophilia hypothesis